The 2022 Trofeo Laigueglia was a one-day road cycling race that took place on 2 March 2022 in and around Laigueglia. It was the 59th edition of the Trofeo Laigueglia and was rated as a 1.Pro event as part the 2022 UCI ProSeries. The race covered 202 kilometres (126 mi) and finished off with four laps of a finishing circuit that was 11 kilometres (6.8 mi) long and featured two short and sharp climbs, the Colla Micheri and the Capo Mele.

Teams
Twenty-five teams were invited to the race. Along with the Italian national team, there were eight UCI WorldTour teams, seven UCI ProTeams, and eight UCI Continental teams. Of the starting peloton of 165 riders, only 79 finished.

UCI WorldTeams

 
 
 
 
 
 
 
 

UCI ProTeams

 
 
 
 
 
 
 

UCI Continental teams

 
 
 
 
 
 
 
 

National teams
 Italy

Result

References 

Trofeo Laigueglia
Trofeo Laigueglia
2022
Trofeo Laigueglia